"I Wanna Dance with Somebody (Who Loves Me)" is a song recorded by American singer Whitney Houston for her second studio album, Whitney (1987). It was released as the lead single from the album on May 2, 1987, by Arista Records. It was produced by Narada Michael Walden, and written by George Merrill and Shannon Rubicam, of the band Boy Meets Girl, who had previously collaborated with Houston on "How Will I Know."

"I Wanna Dance with Somebody (Who Loves Me)" received mixed reviews from music critics, who praised Houston's vocal performance but critiqued its musical arrangement comparing it to "How Will I Know" and Cyndi Lauper's "Girls Just Want to Have Fun." Despite the mixed critical response, the song became a worldwide success, topping the charts in eighteen countries including Australia, Italy, Germany and the UK. In the US, it became Houston's fourth consecutive chart topper and is certified 6× platinum with sales of over 6 million copies.

At the 30th Annual Grammy Awards, "I Wanna Dance with Somebody (Who Loves Me)" won for Best Female Pop Vocal Performance, marking Houston's second win in the category.

Background
"I Wanna Dance with Somebody (Who Loves Me)" was written by George Merrill and Shannon Rubicam, who wrote Houston's 1985 song "How Will I Know," which became successful, and as a result, they were asked to come up with another song for Houston's then-new album. Originally the song that gave Merrill and Rubicam their US/UK  top ten success as Boy Meets Girl, "Waiting For a Star to Fall" was intended by the duo to be a song for Houston. The duo sent it to Arista Records, but they passed on it citing it was not suitable for Houston. Undeterred by this minor setback, the pair continued working on finding a song that would be ideal for Houston and was inspired to come up with "I Wanna Dance with Somebody." Later on, Rubicam explained the idea behind the song:

The song failed to impress producer Narada Michael Walden, who had produced "How Will I Know." He took a little more persuading with regard to the song's potential, and at first was not too keen on having Houston record it, as he felt it was too "country and western sounding." He said of it,

For the song's production, a Roland TR-808 was used to produce the drum machine percussion.

Critical reception
"I Wanna Dance with Somebody (Who Loves Me)" received mixed reviews from critics. Vince Aletti of Rolling Stone magazine, in a review of the album Whitney, criticized the song, commenting that "not taking any chances, the songwriters [Merill Griffith and Shannon Rubicam] have simply come up with a clever anagram of their original hit [How Will I Know], and [Narada Michael] Walden has glossed it over in an identically perky style. The strategy is not so different from that behind Hollywood's blockbuster sequels: this is 'How Will I Know II'." Los Angeles Timess pop music critic, Robert Hilburn described the song as "a deliciously raucous tune with a bit of the synthesizer underpinning and giddy zest of Cyndi Lauper's 'Girls Just Want to Have Fun.'"

In his review of Whitney, Jon Pareles of The New York Times gave a negative comment, writing that listening to "I Wanna Dance with Somebody (Who Loves Me)" and "You're Still My Man," another track on the album was like "watching television while someone fiddles with color controls." In 2006, Slant Magazine ranked the song at #88 in their 100 Greatest Dance Songs, commenting that "with its parenthetical title, gummy bassline, schmaltzy horns, tinkling keyboards, and half-step key changes, [the song] is definitive '80s dance-pop." By 2020, the publication's staff had reranked it to #58.

Accolades
"I Wanna Dance with Somebody (Who Loves Me)" won the award for "Favorite Pop/Rock Single" at the 15th American Music Awards on January 25, 1988. Additionally, Houston won the Grammy award for "Best Pop Vocal Performance, Female" with the song at its 30th ceremony on March 2, 1988, where she received a total of three nominations. The music video for the song was nominated for "Best Music Video" at the 2nd Soul Train Music Awards on March 30, 1988. Houston won the award for "Best Music Video" for the video at the 1st Garden State Music Awards. In 2015 the song was voted by the British public as the nation's fifth favourite 1980s number one in a poll for ITV. In 2021, Rolling Stone ranked "I Wanna Dance with Somebody (Who Loves Me)" at number 231 on their updated list of the 500 Greatest Songs of All Time.

Chart performance
"I Wanna Dance with Somebody (Who Loves Me)" was released as the first single from Houston's second studio album at the beginning of May 1987. It entered the Billboard Hot 100, the issue dated May 16, 1987, at number 38, her highest debut in the 1980s. Six weeks later, it reached the top spot of the chart, making it Houston's fourth number-one single in the United States, the issue date of June 27, 1987 ― the same day that Houston's album Whitney debuted at number one on the Billboard 200 (known at the time as "Top Pop Albums") the first time ever by a female artist. It remained there for two weeks, spent nine weeks in the top ten (more than any other song that year) and spent 18 weeks on the chart. The song reached number one on the Hot 100 Single Sales chart for two weeks, and on the Hot 100 Airplay chart for three weeks, her longest run at that time. The single also peaked at number one on the Hot Adult Contemporary and the remixed dance / club version by Steve Thompson and Michael Barbiero became Houston's first chart-topper on the Billboard Hot Dance/Club Play Songs, staying on the top position of the charts for three weeks and two weeks, respectively. In addition, it reached a peak of two on the Billboard Hot R&B/Hip-Hop Songs chart (known then as "Hot Black Singles"), the issue date of July 4, 1987. It remained at that position for two weeks, behind "I Feel Good All Over" by Stephanie Mills (which never appeared on the Hot 100 at all), and spent 15 weeks on the R&B chart.

On July 28, 1987, the single was certified Gold by the Recording Industry Association of America (RIAA), for shipment of 1,000,000 copies of the single, and re-certified Platinum, making it Houston's first single to achieve that feat, for the same shipment on February 13, 1989, with the change of the RIAA certification criteria for singles. (The number of sales required to qualify for gold and platinum discs was higher prior to January 1, 1989. The thresholds were 1,000,000 units (gold) and 2,000,000 units (platinum), reflecting a decrease in sales of singles. It placed at number four on the Billboard Year-End Top Pop Singles chart for 1987. In Canada, the song debuted at 74 on the RPM Top 100 Singles chart, the issue dated May 9, 1987, and reached the top of the chart on July 4, 1987. It was ranked second on the RPM Year-End Top 100 Singles chart for 1987. The single was later certified Gold by the Canadian Recording Industry Association (CRIA) on February 29, 1988.

Internationally, the song was a massive hit, becoming her most successful single at the time. It reached number one in fourteen countries. The song debuted at number 10 on the UK Singles Chart, the week ending date of May 23, 1987. Two weeks later, it reached number one on the chart, the week ending June 6, 1987, becoming her second UK number-one single. The single was certified Gold by the British Phonographic Industry (BPI) on August 1, 1987, for shipments of 400,000 copies. According to The Official Charts Company, it has sold 760,000 copies in the United Kingdom and was the first number one hit to be released with a CD single in the UK. The single also topped the singles chart in Belgium for three weeks, the Netherlands for four weeks, Germany for five weeks, Italy for a week, Norway for seven weeks, Sweden for six weeks and Switzerland for six weeks, and peaked inside top five in Austria and Ireland. This popularity of the single across Europe led to the song topping the European Hot 100 Singles chart for eight weeks. It became Houston's second number-one single on the Australian Kent Music Report chart, staying at the top for five weeks. The song also peaked at number one on the New Zealand Singles Chart and remained there for four weeks, making it Houston's first number-one single in the country.

"I Wanna Dance with Somebody (Who Loves Me)" the single sold 4.2 million copies worldwide. After her death, the single returned to the Billboard Hot 100 debuting at number 35 the same week "I Will Always Love You" re-entered at number 7, giving Houston two posthumous Top 40 hits.

Music video

The video for "I Wanna Dance with Somebody (Who Loves Me)" was directed by Brian Grant and choreographed by Arlene Phillips, who also worked with Houston on the music video for "How Will I Know". It played on MTV in heavy rotation. The video features Houston in a pink dress and a continuous shot of a purple backdrop that never changes its angle of vision. In the intro of this video, Houston just finishes a performance onstage. She walks backstage, and the scene is intercut with more vivid, colorful images of her. The song then explodes into its beginning, with myriad locations and various outfits by Houston, as dancers trying to impress her as she dances. Towards the end of the song she manhandles a guy, who has a mixture of a look of shock and surprise asking him "Don't you wanna dance say you wanna dance". The video was remastered in 4K to celebrate the 35th anniversary of the release of the Whitney album and it has over 377 million views as of November 2022 on YouTube, making it the fifth most watched music video by a female artist released in the 1980s behind Cyndi Lauper's "Time After Time", Madonna's "La Isla Bonita", Bonnie Tyler's "Total Eclipse of the Heart" and Lauper's "Girls Just Wanna Have Fun" respectively.

Live performances

Houston performed the song on almost all of her world and regional tours. She premiered its usage during the later shows of The Greatest Love World Tour in 1986, before its official release of the following year, introducing the song, along with "Didn't We Almost Have It All", as new tunes from her upcoming album. During her European promotion for a new album from April–May 1987, Houston performed the song on various television series such as Domenica In (an Italian entertainment programme), the Montreux Golden Rose Rock Festival: IM&MC Gala (May 15, 1987), and Top of the Pops (May 21, 1987), where she sang live, unlike some other performers who lip-synched on the programme.

Houston's Moment of Truth World Tour in 1987-88 had her performing it as the finale song of the tour. She performed it without back-up dancers on the North American leg (1987), and with four dancers on the European leg of the tour (1988). Two different performances of the song were recorded in Saratoga Springs, New York on September 2, 1987, and at Wembley Arena in London, United Kingdom in May 1988; the first was broadcast on MTV, during the 4th MTV Video Music Awards on September 11, 1987. The second was taken from one night of nine sold-out Wembley Arena concerts, aired by Italian channel Rai Uno on a special program for her in 1988. On March 2, 1988, Houston opened the night of the 30th Annual Grammy Awards singing the song. During the European leg of the tour, she participated in the Nelson Mandela 70th Birthday Tribute Concert and performed the song in front of about 72,000 people at Wembley Stadium on June 11, 1988.

Houston also performed "I Wanna Dance with Somebody (Who Loves Me)" as part of her set on fourteen-date Feels So Right Tour in Japan. One performance of the song on the tour was recorded at Yokohama Arena on January 7, 1990, and later broadcast on Japanese television. On March 17, she sang the song live on That's What Friends Are For: Arista Records 15th Anniversary AIDS Benefit Concert, televised on CBS on April 17, 1990. This performance was included in the 2014 CD/DVD release, Whitney Houston Live: Her Greatest Performances.

In 1991, Houston opened her I'm Your Baby Tonight World Tour with "I Wanna Dance with Somebody (Who Loves Me)". Three different performances of the song were taped and broadcast: the first was in Yokohama, Japan on March 15 and the second was in Norfolk, Virginia, the concert itself entitled Welcome Home Heroes, televised live on HBO on March 31 and later released as the video of the same name; the third was in A Coruña, Spain on September 29, broadcast on a Spanish television channel and later featured on the select set-list on This Is My Life, her first hour-long special which aired on ABC, May 6, 1992.

"I Wanna Dance with Somebody (Who Loves Me)" was also performed during The Bodyguard World Tour (1993–94). On the tour, five different performances of the song were recorded and televised; four were on the South American leg of the tour in 1994 ― Brazil, Chile, Argentina and Venezuela ― and one was in Johannesburg, South Africa, broadcast live via satellite on HBO on November 12, 1994, the concert itself entitled The Concert for a New South Africa. Houston also performed the song at a 25-minute pregame show of the 1994 FIFA World Cup Final at Rose Bowl in Los Angeles, broadcast in more than 180 countries on July 17, 1994.

"I Wanna Dance with Somebody (Who Loves Me)" was included in the set-list on two regional tours, The Pacific Rim Tour (1997) and The European Tour (1998). During the My Love Is Your Love World Tour of 1999, the remix version of the song was performed as a part of '1980s Dance Medley' along with "How Will I Know". One performance of the song on the tour was recorded in Sopot, Poland and broadcast live on Polish channel TVP1 on August 22, 1999. In 2000, Houston performed the song as a similar version to that of her '99 tour at Arista Records 25th Anniversary Celebration, recorded at Shrine Auditorium in Los Angeles on April 10, and broadcast on May 15 on NBC.

Track listing and formatsUS 12" vinyl single (Version 1) "I Wanna Dance with Somebody (Who Loves Me)" (12" Remix) – 8:33
 "I Wanna Dance with Somebody (Who Loves Me)" (Single version) – 4:52
 "I Wanna Dance with Somebody (Who Loves Me)" (12" Remix Radio edit) – 4:51
 "I Wanna Dance with Somebody (Who Loves Me)" (Dub Mix) – 6:48
 "I Wanna Dance with Somebody (Who Loves Me)" (A cappella) – 5:18US 12" vinyl single (Version 2) "I Wanna Dance with Somebody (Who Loves Me)" (12" Remix) – 8:33
 "I Wanna Dance with Somebody (Who Loves Me)" (Single version) – 4:52
 "I Wanna Dance with Somebody (Who Loves Me)" (Dub Mix) – 6:48
 "I Wanna Dance with Somebody (Who Loves Me)" (A cappella Mix) – 5:18
 "Moment of Truth" – 4:38UK 7" vinyl single "I Wanna Dance with Somebody (Who Loves Me)" – 4:52
 "Moment of Truth" – 4:39UK promo VHS single "I Wanna Dance with Somebody (Who Loves Me)" (Music Video) – 5:15UK 5" maxi-CD single "I Wanna Dance with Somebody (Who Loves Me)" (12" Remix) – 8:32
 "Moment of Truth" – 4:36
 "I Wanna Dance with Somebody (Who Loves Me)" (Dub Mix) – 6:48US 5" promo maxi-CD single "I Wanna Dance with Somebody (Who Loves Me)" (Single version) – 4:52
 "I Wanna Dance with Somebody (Who Loves Me)" (12″ Remix Radio edit) – 4:51
 "I Wanna Dance with Somebody (Who Loves Me)" (12" Remix) – 8:36

Credits and personnel

Writer ― George Merrill, Shannon Rubicam
Producer, arranger ― Narada Michael Walden
Vocal arrangement ― Whitney Houston
Drums ― Narada Michael Walden
Synths ― Walter "Baby Love" Afanasieff
Bass synth ― Randy "The King" Jackson
Guitar synth ― Corrado Rustici
Percussion programming ― Preston "Tiger Head" Glass
Alto sax ― Marc Russo
Simmons ― Greg "Gigi" Gonaway
Synth horns ― Sterling
Background vocals ― Jim Gilstrap, Karen "Kitty Beethoven" Brewington, Kevin Dorsey, Myrna Matthews, Jennifer Hall, Whitney Houston
Recording, mixing ― David Fraser
Assistant engineer ― Dana Jon Chappelle
Additional engineers ― Lincoln Clapp, Gordon Lyon, Jay Rifkin, Ken Kessie, Maureen Droney
Additional assistant engineers ― Gordon Lyon, Stuart Hirotsu, Paul "Goatee" Hamingson, Noah Baron, Bill "Sweet William" Miranda, Ross Williams, Rob Beaton

Charts

Weekly charts

Year-end charts

Decade-end charts

All-time charts

Certifications

See also

List of best-selling singles
List of best-selling singles in the United States
List of number-one singles in Australia in 1987
List of Top 25 singles for 1987 in Australia
Nummer 1-hits in de BRT Top 30 in 1987
List of RPM number-one singles of 1987
Dutch Top 40 number-one hits of 1987
List of European number-one hits of 1987
 List of number-one hits of 1987 (Finland) (in Finnish)
Number-one hits of 1987 (Germany)
List of number-one hits of 1987 (Italy)
List of number-one singles in 1987 (New Zealand)
List of number-one hits 1987 (Norway)
List of Swedish number-one hits
List of number-one hits of 1987 (Switzerland)
List of number-one singles from the 1980s (UK)
List of Billboard Hot 100 number-one singles of 1987
List of number-one adult contemporary singles of 1987 (U.S.)
List of number-one dance singles of 1987 (U.S.)

ReferencesBibliography'

External links
I Wanna Dance With Somebody (Who Loves Me) at Discogs

1986 songs
1987 songs
1987 singles
Whitney Houston songs
UK Singles Chart number-one singles
Billboard Hot 100 number-one singles
Cashbox number-one singles
Number-one singles in Australia
European Hot 100 Singles number-one singles
Number-one singles in Germany
Number-one singles in Italy
Dutch Top 40 number-one singles
Number-one singles in New Zealand
Number-one singles in South Africa
Number-one singles in Sweden
Number-one singles in Switzerland
Number-one singles in Norway
American dance-pop songs
Post-disco songs
Ashley Tisdale songs
David Byrne songs
Songs written by Shannon Rubicam
Songs written by George Merrill (songwriter)
RPM Top Singles number-one singles
Song recordings produced by Narada Michael Walden
Songs about dancing
Arista Records singles
Grammy Award for Best Female Pop Vocal Performance